In enzymology, a nitroquinoline-N-oxide reductase is an enzyme that catalyzes the chemical reaction

4-(hydroxyamino)quinoline N-oxide + 2 NAD(P)+ + H2O  4-nitroquinoline N-oxide + 2 NAD(P)H + 2 H+

The 4 substrates of this enzyme are 4-hydroxyaminoquinoline N-oxide, NAD+, NADP+, and H2O, whereas its 4 products are 4-nitroquinoline N-oxide, NADH, NADPH, and H+.

This enzyme belongs to the family of oxidoreductases, specifically those acting on other nitrogenous compounds as donors with NAD+ or NADP+ as acceptor.  The systematic name of this enzyme class is 4-(hydroxyamino)quinoline N-oxide:NADP+ oxidoreductase. Other names in common use include 4-nitroquinoline 1-oxide reductase, 4NQO reductase, and NAD(P)H2:4-nitroquinoline-N-oxide oxidoreductase.

References

 
 

EC 1.7.1
NADPH-dependent enzymes
NADH-dependent enzymes
Enzymes of unknown structure